The Union Trust Bank Company Building is a historic bank building located at 200 Collinsville Avenue in downtown East St. Louis, Illinois.

Background
Built from 1922 to 1926, the building housed the Union Trust & Savings Bank, which was founded in 1901 by August Schlafly. Architect Thomas Imbs designed the Classical Revival building. The bank's opening followed a major race riot and a series of corruption scandals in East St. Louis, and its construction marked a turnaround in what had until then been a struggling city. The new building inspired confidence in the city's downtown, and several landmark buildings were built in downtown East St. Louis in the ensuing decade. The building was one of two Classical Revival banks built in East St. Louis and is the only one which is still standing.

The building was added to the National Register of Historic Places on May 27, 2014.

References

Bank buildings on the National Register of Historic Places in Illinois
East St. Louis, Illinois
Buildings and structures in St. Clair County, Illinois
Neoclassical architecture in Illinois
Commercial buildings completed in 1926
National Register of Historic Places in St. Clair County, Illinois